Hesitation is the psychological process of a pause in the course of making a decision or taking an action.

Hesitation or Hesitate may also refer to:

 The Hesitations, an American R'n'B group
 "Hesitation", a 1982 instrumental by Wynton Marsalis from Wynton Marsalis
 "Hesitation", a 2003 song by Stacie Orrico from Stacie Orrico
 Hesitation, a break in tempo at contract bridge
 "Hesitate (Stone Sour song)", a 2010 song by Stone Sour
 "Hesitate (Jonas Brothers song)", a 2019 song by Jonas Brothers

See also
 Pause (disambiguation)